Unione Sportiva Comacchio Lidi is an Italian association football club located in Comacchio, Emilia-Romagna. It currently plays in Serie D. Its colors are red and blue.

Football clubs in Italy
Football clubs in Emilia-Romagna
Association football clubs established in 1917
1917 establishments in Italy